Android Kunjappan Version 5.25 is a 2019 Indian Malayalam-language science fiction comedy-drama film written and directed by Ratheesh Balakrishnan Poduval (in his directorial debut), produced by Santhosh T. Kuruvilla, and starring Suraj Venjaramoodu, Soubin Shahir, Sooraj Thelakkad, Kendy Zirdo, and Saiju Kurup.

The music was composed by Bijibal. In the plot, Subramanian (Soubin Shahir) goes to Russia for work, leaving his old-age father Bhaskaran Poduval (Suraj Venjaramoodu) with an android called Kunjappan (Sooraj Thelakkad) to take care of him. Bhaskaran, however, hates the idea. Also, it may be inspired from 2012 American movie Robot & Frank.

The film was released in India on 8 November 2019. It received critical acclaim and was one of the commercially successful Malayalam films released in the year. The movie won three Kerala State Film Awards including Best Actor award for Suraj.

Plot
Bhaskaran Poduval (Suraj Venjaramoodu) is a stubborn old man who is very reluctant to get accustomed to any new-age technology and is therefore seen as a 'boomer' by some of the younger men in town. He resides in Payyanur with his son Subramanian alias Chuppan (Soubin Shahir), a mechanical engineer. He is first seen at the Bali ceremony of his friend Kunjappan, who is shown to be a rather short man. As Kunjappan's son Vinu is in the middle of performing the ritual, Bhaskaran questions some aspects of the ritual, eventually infuriating Vinu, who storms off in a rage. 
Bhaskaran wants his son to be by his side during his last days, and that is why he prohibits his son from applying for any job, and to refuse any job offer he receives. Subramanian, in frustration, demands on going to Russia, as he had got a job in a Japanese Robotics firm there. This causes an argument between the father and son, which ends in Subramanian leaving for Russia.

Once there, he meets Hitomi, the daughter of a Malayali father and a Japanese mother, who is very fond of Kerala and Keralites. They form a close bond, and Hitomi tells Subramanian about her father who died of Alzheimer's. She also introduces him to the robotic home nurse (an android) who took care of her father during his last days. While repairing the robot, he gets a call from his cousin Prasannan (Saiju Kurup) (who takes care of Bhaskaran), telling him that the maid that Subramanian had employed to look after Bhaskaran was not good, and that he should immediately return home. Subramanian feels guilty about his inability to take care of his father, and he discusses the idea of resigning with Hitomi and his boss. However, his boss persuades him to not to give up on a promising career for a task that someone else can do.

Subramanian returns home with the latest Android Robot (Version 5.25) to take care of his father. Although Bhaskaran was hesitant to accept the robot into his life, even being somewhat scared of it at first, eventually develops a strong liking to the robot and then, unexpectedly, becomes too attached to it. It (or he at this point) is named Kunjappan (lit. short man), which creates some confusion among the locals, as there was also another Kunjappan (Vinu's father). Slowly, the robot becomes irreplaceably close to Bhaskaran's heart. Kunjappan also helped Bhaskaran to make contact with his ex-lover Soudamini.

Soon enough, Bhaskaran starts to see Kunjappan as his own son. However, Subramanian becomes extremely worried about Bhaskaran. So, he decides to quit his job and go back home along with Hitomi. Subramanian convinces Bhaskaran to go to the local pond for his bath without Kunjappan. However, after having food with Subramanian, he sees Hitomi repairing a disassembled Kunjappan. Enraged to see this, Bhaskaran tries to stop it, but Subramanian stops him. Bhaskaran furiously asks what Subramanian is playing at, and Subramanian flares back that the robot will eventually kill him. Bhaskaran shouts back that even if Bhaskaran can't take care of him, at least to let Kunjappan do it. Subramanian, knowing that his father will suffer Cardiac Arrest if he gets too worked up, restores Kunjappan to its previous state. That night, Hitomi and Subramanian watches a CCTV Camera footage of a previously modelled robot strangling its aged customer to death. He becomes scared and finds Bhaskaran and Kunjappan are missing. Bhaskaran left home with Kunjappan to a forest nearby where he thought that they could live, undisturbed. Meanwhile, Subramanian and Hitomi, searching for Bhaskaran and Kunjappan, arrive at the forest with Prasannan. After Bhaskaran sends a message to Soudamini, Kunjappan tells Bhaskaran that what Subramanian told was right and he is not a human being but a machine whose job was to assist him. He doesn't want Bhaskaran to love him or he doesn't know it also. He tells him to leave him in the forest and to go back. Bhaskaran becomes emotional and heartbroken when Kunjappan tells him like that. When Subramanian finds Bhaskaran, Vinu attacks Kunjappan and steals his head. In its in-built security reflex, Kunjappan strangles Subramanian. However, Bhaskaran saves Subramanian. Bhaskaran, Subramanian, Hitomi and Prasannan leave for home, and while on the back of Subramanian's motorcycle, Bhaskaran sees Subramanian as Kunjappan, and whispers his name.

Cast
 Suraj Venjaramoodu as V. K. Bhaskaran Poduval
 Soubin Shahir as Subramanian (Chuppan)
 Sooraj Thelakkad as Android Kunjappan Version 5.25
 Saiju Kurup as Prasannan 
 Kendy Zirdo as Hitomi
 Parvathi T. as Soudamini
 Rajesh Madhavan as Vinu
 Sivadas Kannur as Murali
 Unni Raja Tailor Raghu
 Renji Kankol as Babu
 Megha Mathew as Seetha
 Ratheesh Balakrishnan Poduval as Subramanian's boss

Production
Android Kunjappan Version 5.25 marks the directorial debut of Ratheesh Balakrishnan Poduval who has also written the screenplay. Soubin Shahir was the first actor to be cast in the film. For the role of 80-year old Bhaskara Poduval, an older actor was being sought; but Shahir and producer Santhosh T. Kuruvilla suggested Suraj Venjaramood who is in his 40s and works primarily as a comedian. The film is set in Payyannur, Kannur district and the characters speak Kannur dialect. When Thiruvananthapuram-based Suraj (who has a Thiruvananthapuram accent) was brought on board, Poduval thought of giving the character a Thiruvananthapuram background to justify the mixed accent. But Suraj adapted to the Kannur accent so well that such a change became unnecessary. For the half Japanese half Malayali character Hitomi, the plan to bring any Japanese actors proved to be difficult and they cast Kendy Zirdo who was from Arunachal Pradesh. For the Android robot, the plan was to use VFX throughout the film, but due to budget constraints, Sooraj Thelakkad who is popular as a mimicry artiste in television shows played the role of the robot in the movie. Sooraj dressed up himself as the robot for the movie. Most of the audience thought that a real robot was used in the movie. But the filmmakers also later confirmed that Sooraj was behind the robot.

Filming began in Saint Petersburg, Russia in May 2019. It was completed in July 2019.

Music

The film features songs composed by Bijibal, with lyrics by B. K. Harinarayanan and A. C. Sreehari.

Release

Theatrical
Android Kunjappan Version 5.25 was released in India on 8 November 2019 and outside India and the United States on 21 November 2019.

Home media
The film dubbed in Telugu as Android Kattappa 5.25 and released on streamimg platform aha

Reception

Box office
In the overseas opening weekend, it grossed £4,770 (₹4.4 lakh) from 51 screens in the United Kingdom, A$5,858 (₹2.86 lakh) in Australia, and US$2,905 (₹2.09 lakh) from 4 screens in Canada. In two weeks, it amassed US$4,746 (₹3.41 lakh) in Canada and £7,394 (₹6.85 lakh) in the UK, and in three weeks, US$22,717 (₹16.16 lakh) in the United States and A$7,150 (₹3.48 lakh) in Australia. According to Kerala Film Producers' Association's statistics, Android Kunjappan Version 5.25 is one among the seven Malayalam films out of the 192 films released in 2019 that profited from the box office revenue alone.

Critical response
The New Indian Express rated 4 out of 5 stars and said that "this is one of those films whose synopsis can be described in one line but explores a myriad of conflicts, emotions, and themes ... the overall effect is that of watching a live-action Pixar film. Android Kunjappan is one of the best films of the year", also praised the actors' performances, particularly Suraj's. Sify rated 3.5 in a scale of 5 and wrote: "With an interesting idea, the writer-director packages an engaging drama with smart scenes, with a good dose of comedy and sentiments ... Android Kunjappan version 5.25 is a delightful comedy that may not be perfect, but gives enough good moments to the viewer" and praised the "terrific form" of Suraj. Firstpost also rated 3.5 out of 5 stars, stating that "Android Kunjappan is unrelentingly funny, yet it is at all times profoundly philosophical", the film's "all-round adorability overshadows its flaws and moments of hesitation" and that Shahir is "pitch perfect" and Suraj is "astonishingly good".

Rating 3.5 out of 5 stars, Manorama Online said that "Android Kunjappan has a fresh and intriguing plot ... even though the focus is on AI and futurism, the sharp satirist in Ratheesh is at play throughout the film. As the scriptwriter, he has managed to craft some caricature-like characters and situations suited for a rustic scenario, without affecting the flow of the movie even a bit". The News Minute also rated 3.5 out of 5, and stated that "this story about an old man and a robot is very, very refreshing indeed for the Malayalam film industry. It has its flaws, but the rawness of the script is endearing", but "the script however falters towards the last few minutes, when it seems to lose direction", but "as far as debuts go, this one scores, and Ratheesh's name shall be remembered", while also praising Suraj's performance.

The Times of India rated 3 out of 5 stars and states that there are many wonderful moments in the first half, "be it as technology, some refreshing comic bits, novel characterizations, story settings and more, the film impresses", but post-interval, "the kind of nemesis created for Kunjappan is impact-less, and the presentation of complications in the situation also emerge a bit dull". Still, "the movie can reward someone with a taste for sci-fi comedies". The Hindu wrote that "at the core, the filmmaker is handling an age-old theme in our cinema, on the need to take care of the elderly ... although there is the expected moralizing that comes with the theme, the film almost stays clear of preaching ... the scriptwriter appears a little clueless as to how to end it all, which probably led to the slightly contrived climactic sequences", but praised the performance of Suraj. Baradwaj Rangan of Film Companion South wrote "The small scenes work beautifully but the bigger themes aren’t handled as well. And the unhinged ending is tonally off".

Accolades

Kerala State Film Awards

 Best Actor - Suraj Venjaramood
 Best Debut Director - Ratheesh Balakrishnan Poduval
 Best Art Director - Jothish Shankar
Indian Recording Arts Academy Awards
 Best Sound Designer (Film - Regional) - Jayadevan Chakkadath

Sequel
In July 2021, it was announced that a sequel for the movie titled Alien Aliyan is in early development. Director Ratheesh Balakrishnan said that the sequel belongs to the sci-fi humour genre and is currently in the final stages of scripting. However, he also revealed that the movie doesn't follow the original's story even though the robot, which was abandoned by the end of the film, will make an appearance.

Remake
The film was remade in Tamil as Koogle Kuttappa.

References

External links
 

2010s Malayalam-language films
Android (robot) films
2010s science fiction comedy-drama films
Indian science fiction comedy-drama films
Robot films
Films set in Russia
Films shot in Russia
Films shot in Kannur
Films shot in Thalassery
Malayalam films remade in other languages